The Prix Patriote de l'année (English:Patriot of the Year prize) is an honorary title created in 1975. It is awarded by the patriotic Saint-Jean-Baptiste Society to people "having distinguished [themselves] in the defense of the interests of Quebec and the democracy of peoples, in memory of the Patriotes of the 1830s."

Laureates 
1975: Madeleine Chaput and Marcel Chaput
1976: François-Albert Angers
1977: Camille Laurin
1978: Andrée Bertrand-Ferretti
1979: Raymond Barbeau
1980: Raymond Lévesque
1981: Jean Duceppe
1985: Jacques Parizeau
1986: Gaston Cholette
1987: Gilles Vigneault
1987: Fernand Roberge
1987: Jacques Henripin
1987: Pierre Harvey
1987: Rolland A. Pinsonneault
1987: Gérald LeBlanc
1987: Yvonne Hubert
1987: André Brassard
1987: Gérald Godin
1987: Claude Gosselin
1987: Gilles Proulx
1987: Lorraine Pagé
1988: Mia Riddez-Morisset
1989: Louis Laberge
1990: Serge Turgeon
1991: Jacques Proulx
1992: Carmen Sabag-Olmedo
1993: Jean-Claude Germain
1994: Paul Piché
1995: Monique Vézina
1996: Gérald Larose
1997: Yves Michaud
1998: Fernand Daoust and Jean-Marc Léger
2000: Jean-Marie Cossette
2001: Marcel Tessier
2002: Pierre Falardeau
2003: Georges Aubin and Renée Blanchet
2004: Luck Mervil
2005: Louise Laurin
2006: Bernard Landry
2007: Loco Locass (trio consisting of Sébastien Fréchette, Sébastien Ricard, Mathieu Farhoud-Dionne)
2008: Robert Laplante
2009: Hélène Pedneault
2010: Gilles Laporte
2011: Denis Trudel
2012: Fred Pellerin, Claudette Carbonneau, Jasmin Roy, Maria Mourani, Julie Snyder, Louis-José Houde and Dominic Champagne
2013: Frédéric Bastien
2014: Pierre Curzi
2015: Robin Philpot

References 
"Liste des Lauréates et lauréats du prix Patriote de l'année" at Bilan du Siècle

See also 
Parti patriote
Patriote Rebellion
Quebec nationalism
Patriotism
Awards

Saint-Jean-Baptiste Society
Politics of Quebec
Quebec awards
Awards established in 1975
1975 establishments in Quebec